Kazimierz Buda (born 3 May 1960, in Mielec) is a retired Polish footballer who played as a defender.

Honours

 1989 Polish Cup

External links
 
 

1960 births
Living people
Polish footballers
Poland international footballers
Association football defenders
Ekstraklasa players
Veikkausliiga players
Legia Warsaw players
Hutnik Warsaw players
Stal Mielec players
Vaasan Palloseura players
Polish expatriate footballers
Expatriate footballers in Finland
People from Mielec
Hutnik Warsaw managers
Polish football managers
Francs Borains players